Elephant is the fourth studio album by the American rock duo the White Stripes. It was released on April 1, 2003, through V2, XL, and Third Man records. The album was recorded across two weeks in April 2002—with the exception of the album's final track "Well, It's True That We Love One Another" which was recorded in November 2001—and produced without the use of computers, instead utilizing an eight-track tape machine and various gear no older than 1963.

The album peaked at number six in the Billboard charts and topped the UK Albums Charts. It sold 4 million records worldwide, and earned several certifications including Platinum from the Recording Industry Association of America and 3x Platinum from the British Phonographic Industry. It spawned the hit single "Seven Nation Army" which has continued to experience commercial success and became a sports anthem. "I Just Don't Know What to Do with Myself", "The Hardest Button to Button" and "There's No Home for You Here" were also released as singles.

Elephant has received critical acclaim, and it is often cited as the White Stripes' best work. The album earned several accolades, including a nomination for Album of the Year and a win for Best Alternative Music Album at the 46th Grammy Awards. In 2012, Rolling Stone magazine ranked it 390th on its list of "The 500 Greatest Albums of All Time", and additionally ranked it the fifth-best album of the 2000's decade. Authors and reviewers have praised Elephant as one of the best albums of the 21st century.

Recording
Elephant was recorded over two weeks in April 2002 in London's modest Toe Rag Studios except for the songs "Well It's True That We Love One Another," which was recorded at Toe Rag in November 2001, and "I Just Don't Know What to Do With Myself", which was recorded at the BBC's Maida Vale Studios. Including the song "I Just Don't Know What to Do With Myself" (a Dusty Springfield/Burt Bacharach cover) in their repertoire was Meg's idea, and the band had begun to cover the song live. "You've Got Her in Your Pocket" was a song that had been written by Jack soon after the band's debut album was released in 1999. He had planned on eventually giving it to a local band to cover, but ultimately felt it was too personal to give away and decided to include it in the album. "Girl, You've Got No Faith in Medicine" was originally written for the band's previous album, White Blood Cells, but Meg had disliked the song and it was removed. After debating it, the song was rerecorded and included in Elephant, but only after a line from the song was removed after it was deemed too harsh.

According to a review in The New York Times, the White Stripes attempted to achieve the idea of "Back to Basics" as well as encouraging other rockers to try the same way. Jack White produced the album with antiquated equipment, including an eight-track tape machine and pre-1960s recording gear. As stated in the liner notes, White did not use computers during Elephant's writing, recording, or production. and none of the recording equipment was more recent than 1963.

Composition
Elephant has been described musically as garage rock revival, blues rock, and punk blues. The album's lyrical themes revolve around the idea of the "death of the sweetheart" in American culture. In this album, the White Stripes expanded their style with a bass line alongside lead and rhythm guitar. Jack played guitar or keyboard to fill out the sound. Like other White Stripes records, the cover art and liner notes are exclusively in red, white, and black.

Artwork
In an interview with Q Magazine in 2007, Jack White said, "If you study the picture carefully, Meg and I are elephant ears in a head-on elephant. But it's a side view of an elephant, too, with the tusks leading off either side." He went on to say, "I wanted people to be staring at this album cover and then maybe two years later, having stared at it for the 500th time, to say, 'Hey, it's an elephant!'"

The album has been released with at least six different versions of the front cover—different covers for the CD and LP editions in the US, the UK and elsewhere. To give an example, on the US CD edition Meg White is sitting on the left of a circus travel trunk and Jack is sitting on the right holding a cricket bat over the ground, while on the UK CD edition the cricket bat touches the ground and the image is mirrored so that their positions on the amplifier are reversed. The UK vinyl album cover is the same as the US CD but differs in that the color hues are much darker. The cryptic symbolism of the album art includes a skull sitting on the floor in the background, as well as peanuts and peanut shells in the foreground, and on the circus travel trunk appears the mark "III," Jack White's signature. Jack White is also displaying a mano cornuta and looking at a light bulb intensely, while Meg White is barefoot and appears to be crying, with a rope tied around her ankle and leading out of frame. Both have small white ribbons tied to their fingers. On the reverse side of the U.S. edition, all of the number "3"s are in red (disregarding the authorization notes at the bottom).

The Record Store Day 2013 vinyl and August 2013 180-gram black vinyl reissues have Meg wearing a black dress instead of the usual white dress; the only other release with Meg wearing the black dress was on the V2 advanced copy back in 2003. The advanced copy was on red and white vinyl, while the RSD copy has red, black and white colored vinyl in 2013.

Release 
Elephant was released on April 1, 2003, through V2, XL, and Third Man records; it was their second album to be released by V2 records. In 2013, Third Man Records released a limited edition vinyl reissue of Elephant, in celebration of the album's 10-year anniversary, which were pressed at United Record Pressing in Nashville, TN. In January 2023, a second reissue of the album, titled Elephant XX, was released exclusively through Third Man Records. In March that same year, an Elephant deluxe edition was announced, which includes live recordings from a performance in Chicago's Aragon Ballroom.

Reception and legacy

Upon its release, Elephant received widespread acclaim from music critics. The album enjoys a Metacritic rating of 92. The White Stripes were gaining momentum with their previous three albums and were generally lauded in critical circles, and many critics hailed Elephant as one of the defining events of the 2000s garage rock revival. They went on to play two summer concerts with the Rolling Stones and a sold-out gig at the venerable Radio City Music Awards.

David Fricke of Rolling Stone called Elephant "a work of pulverizing perfection," adding, "It will be one of the best things you hear all year" and that White matched the energy from his earlier albums, thought to even "[exceed] the plantation holler of 2000's De Stijl and 2001's White Blood Cells with blues that both pop and bleed". Uncut magazine remarked that "Elephant is where the tabloid phenomenon of summer 2001 prove they are no flash in the pan by making a truly phenomenal record." AllMusic said the album "overflows with quality". NME noted that "The eloquence, barbarism, tenderness and sweat-drenched vitality of Elephant make it the most realised White Stripes album yet." PopMatters said the album cemented "their evolution from Blind Willie McTell cover band with a pop sensibility to full-fledged, honest-to-goodness rock 'n' roll gods." Robert Christgau initially gave the album a three-star honorable mention upon release, but later admitted that he had underrated it, and gave it a new grade of A−. The "gimmicks" that surrounded the White Stripes' music—particularly their insistence on being called siblings—were criticized by Lorraine Ali of Newsweek, although she concluded that "Elephant still sounds great."

Elephant won Grammy Awards for Best Alternative Music Album and Best Rock Song ("Seven Nation Army"), and won three MTV Video Music Awards. Rolling Stone deemed it one of the best albums of the decade, and ranked it number 390 on their 2012 list of the 500 greatest albums of all time and number 449 in the 2020 edition. It was also listed in the book 1001 Albums You Must Hear Before You Die.

Rankings

Accolades

Track listing

Personnel
According to the liner notes and CD booklet.

The White Stripes
 Jack White – vocal, guitar, piano, producer, mixing
 Meg White – drums, vocal

Guest personnel
 Mort Crim – vocal
 Holly Golightly – vocal on the track "It's True That We Love One Another"

Technical
 Liam Watson – engineering, mixing
 Noel Summerville – mastering
 "The Third Man" – artwork
 Patrick Pantano – photography
 Bruce Brand – layout

Charts

Weekly charts

Year-end charts

Certifications

Notes

References

External links

 Elephant at Discogs
 

The White Stripes albums
2003 albums
V2 Records albums
XL Recordings albums
Grammy Award for Best Alternative Music Album
Albums produced by Jack White
Third Man Records albums